Malakoff Diggings may refer to:

Malakoff Diggings, former name of Malakoff, California
Malakoff Diggins State Historic Park, in California